The 1964 National Semi-Professional Football League was first season of National Semi-Professional Football League. The 1964 season was divided into spring league and autumn league.

Spring
Spring season of 1964 National Semi-Professional Football League saw the ten teams divided into two groups of five teams. Spring season was held from 7 July to 14 July 1964 in Hyochang Stadium.

Group A

Group B

Final

Champions

Autumn
Autumn season of 1964 National Semi-Professional Football League operated full-league from 10 October to 8 November 1964 in Seoul.

Keumseong Textile won the season on goal differences.

Champions

References

Korean National Semi-Professional Football League